Swamped may refer to:
 Swamped (The Batman)
 "Swamped" (song), a 2004 song by Lacuna Coil